Ross Wilfred Gray (5 January 1897 – 11 December 1968) was a Liberal party member of the House of Commons of Canada. He was born in Moore Township in Lambton County, Ontario and became a barrister by career.

Gray attended Sarnia Collegiate then Osgoode Hall Law School then attended Harvard University for post-graduate studies. He served with the Canadian Field Artillery from 1916 to 1919. From 1924 to 1927, he was a member of the Sarnia Board of Education.

He was first elected to Parliament at the Lambton West riding in a by-election on 14 January 1929 then re-elected there in 1930, 1935 and 1940. Gray was defeated by Joseph Warner Murphy of the Progressive Conservative party in the 1945 election.

References

External links
 

1897 births
1968 deaths
Liberal Party of Canada MPs
Members of the House of Commons of Canada from Ontario
People from Lambton County